Liu Hulan (刘胡兰, 1932–1947) was a young female spy during the Chinese Civil War between the Kuomintang and the Communist Party.  She was born in Yunzhouxi village, in the Wenshui County of the Shanxi province.  She joined the Communist Party in 1946 and soon after joined an association of women working in support of the Liberation Army.  She was actively involved in organizing the villagers of Yunzhouxi in support of the Communist Party of China. Her contributions involved a wide range of activities, such as supplying food to the Eighth Liberation Army, relaying secret messages, and mending boots and uniforms.

Biography 
On October 8, 1932, Ms. Liu Hulan was born in a middle-class peasant family in Yunzhou West Village, Shanxi Province.

In January 1945, Liu Hulan participated in the movement of seizing gain by the Western Union and loaded grain with the revolutionaries.

In October 1945, Hulan carried her family to Guanjiabao village and participated in the training course of women's liberation. She was elected as a group leader and devoted herself to study. At the local anti-hegemony meeting, she took the stage to speak, denounced the crimes of the hegemonic landlords and the feudal customs. After graduation, she served as secretary of Village Women's Rescue Committee.  She organized women to run winter schools, helped the martyrs to solve difficulties, supported the army. Together with party members, she fought against landlords, delivered public grain and made military shoes, mobilized young people to join the army.

In February 1946, Liu Hulan took part in the pre-support work of the Dongzhuang battle against Yan Xishan's recalcitrant army.

In 1946, 2000 of the cotton spinning task was handed down in the country, with a deadline of 20 days. Liu Hulan led women to finished the task two days ahead of schedule and won first place in the town. In May 1946, Liu Hulan was transferred to the Woman's Officer of the 15 District “Anti-Japanese League”. She returned to the West Village of Yunzhou to lead the local land reform movement.

In October 1946, Liu Hulan and her remaining comrades conveyed the Communist Party's instructions to the village Communist Organizations and organized the masses to bury grain.

In December 1946, Liu Hulan cooperates with the members of the martial arts team to execute the reactionary village leader ShiPeihuai. Yan Xishan Bandit Army decided to make a large-scale attack on Wenshui area as retaliatory. In order to preserve strength, the 8 Communist Party committees decided to transfer most of the cadres from Pingchuan to Shanshan. Liu hulan was familiar with the environment, therefore volunteered to stay. the party accepted her request.  Wang Being, the company commander of the 12 regiments was wounded. Liu human hid Wang Being in a military family, and carefully nursed him until he recovered. In December, the enemy frequently attacked the Western village of Yunzhou and arrested the underground workers such as Shi Sanhuai. Liu Hulan's family advised her to withdraw, but she insisted on waiting for her superiors.

On January 11, 1947, the superior informed her to transfer. On the next day, the Kuomintang army surrounded the western village of Yunzhou and forced the whole village to gather at Guanyin Temple. The Kuomintang arrested several communists including Shi Shihui, Chen Shurong, Liu Shushan and Zhang Nanchang. Liu Hulan was also arrested as a traitor. During the interrogation, the Kuomintang tried every possible method to induce Liu Hulan to betray her allies. Liu Hulan refused to obey and died "heroically", in the view touted to the Chinese public after the Communists' takeover in 1949.

Anecdotes 
Liu Hulan's had two engagements in her life, a love affair and a ghost marriage. At the beginning of 1946, the parents of the two sides took the initiative to engage Liu Hulan with Chen De, a young man from the neighboring village. However, both parties advocated free love, so they agreed to go home and persuade their parents to terminate their marriage. In June of the same year, someone came to ask for relatives. Liu Hulan refused because she did not know the real situation of the man because he was not often home when he was an apprentice in Taigu County. At that time, Liu Hulan had made up her mind to pursue independent love and marriage.

In the autumn of the same year, Wang Gengu, commander of a PLA regiment, was sent to Yunzhou West Village for training. Wang Gengu suffered from severe scabies. This disease was contagious. Liu Hulan took the initiative to take care of him. Liu Hulan often went to cook and apply medicine for Wang Gengu. They had a lot of contacts and they fell in love. In those days, in the countryside where feudal ideology was more serious, this kind of behavior showed exactly an anti-feudal emancipation of the mind.

Because of the dangerous war environment and Liu Hulan's young age, her marriage with Wang Gengu has not yet been discussed. At that time, Commander Wang gave Liu Hulan's family only a blanket, a pen and a pair of glasses as a pledge. He gave Liu Hulan a small handkerchief as a souvenir when he returned to the army for combat. Liu Hulan handed the handkerchief to his stepmother, Hu Wenxiu, as the most precious item before he was sentenced to death. After Liu Hulan was murdered, Liu Guangqian, the elder uncle, managed to match ghost marriage according to local customs and sacrifices together.

Death 
On January 12, 1947, the Kuomintang army under Yan Xishan invaded her village in response to the assassination of Shi Peihuai, the village chief of Yunzhouxi, who was known to be loyal to the Kuomintang.  Upon entering the village, Kuomintang soldiers rounded up several reputed Communist Party members believed to be involved in the assassination, among them the teenager Liu Hulan.  The party members were decapitated in the town square.  Before killing Liu Hulan, the executioners paused, giving her one final chance to renounce her allegiance to the Communist Party.  She refused and was immediately beheaded.  She was 14 years old.

Significance 
On February 6, 1947, Jinsui Daily published a detailed report on Liu Hulan's heroic inauguration and issued a comment calling on all Communist Party members and the military and civilians of the Liberated Areas to learn from Liu Hulan. On the same day, the Yenan Liberation Daily also published an article entitled "As long as there is a breath of life, we must do it for the people to the end - female Communist Party member Liu Hulan generously righteous". The Jinsui Branch of the CPC Central Committee has endorsed Liu Hulan as a full member of the CPC.            On March 26, 1947, during Mao Zedong's transition to northern Shaanxi under the leadership of the Central Committee of the Communist Party of China, Ren Bishi, Secretary of the Central Secretariat, reported to him Liu Hulan's heroic deeds. Mao Zedong asked, "Is she a Party member?" Ren Bishi said, "He is an excellent Communist Party member, only 15 years old." Moved deeply, Mao Zedong wrote eight big words: "the greatness of life and the glory of death".
Comrade Deng Xiaoping inscribed: "Liu Hulan's noble qualities and her spiritual outlook will always be an example for Chinese youth and adolescents to learn from."
On February 2, 1994, General Secretary Jiang Zemin inscribed Liu Hulan during his inspection in Shanxi Province: "Carry forward the spirit of Hulan and devote oneself to the great cause of Four Modernizations." 
The life and death of Liu Hulan has become a symbol of the courage of the Chinese people, and is often cited as a homily of their loyalty to Communism. Her story is often told as an homage to the struggles endured, and the sacrifices made, for the cause of liberating China from centuries of rule by foreign powers.  In recent history, Chinese political leaders have praised her heroism as the reason why the Chinese Communist Party has risen to take a dominant place in the politics and culture of modern China. 
She is the subject of a 1949 opera, remade in 1954: Liu Hulan.

Influence 
In February 1947, Shanxi Jinsui Daily published the news of Liu Hulan's heroic sacrifice. Liu Hulan's name spread all over North China. At that time, the "Battle Theatre Club" of the 12th Division took Liu Hulan's glorious deeds as its theme, and in more than a month, it created the opera Liu Hulan, which gave the audience a lot of education in each performance.
Six months after Liu Hulan's sacrifice, on August 1, 1947, the Jinsui Branch of the Communist Party of China decided to break the rules (usually until he was 18 years old) and recognize Liu Hulan as a full member of the Communist Party of China.
After the liberation of the whole country, Liu Hulan's deeds were written into books, adapted into plays, movies and TV plays, and her former village was changed to "Liu Hulan Village".
In 1956, the Liu Hulan Memorial Hall was established in Wenshui County, Shanxi Province. The Martyrs'Cemetery was built in Yunzhou West Village, the hometown of the martyrs. The Yongzhi Memorial was commemorated. The remains of Liu Hulan were moved to the cemetery separately. With a total floor area of more than 60,000 square meters, it is composed of square, monument, Liu Hulan's life story exhibition room, film and television room, calligraphy and painting room, seven Martyrs Memorial Hall and group sculptures, mausoleum, Liu Hulan statue, monument pavilion, martyr's original site, symmetrically distributed with monuments and mausoleums as the central axis, and contains 74 martyr relics.
On January 31, 1977, China issued a set of stamps commemorating the 30th anniversary of Liu Hulan's heroic inauguration in commemoration of Comrade Liu Hulan, the revolutionary martyr.

References 

Hanyu Yueben.  Shangwu Yinshuguan, Beijing: 1972. (Chpt 7, p32)

1932 births
1947 deaths
Chinese spies
Propaganda in China
Executed Chinese women
Executed spies
People executed by the Republic of China by decapitation
20th-century executions by China
Executed Republic of China people
Executed children
People from Lüliang
Chinese communists
Executed people from Shanxi